Dhiraj Goswami (born 1 May 1985) is an Indian cricketer who plays for Assam in domestic cricket. He is a right-handed batsman and right-arm medium pace bowler. Goswami is a bowling all-rounder. He made his first-class debut in the 2002–03 Ranji Trophy.

References

External links
 

1985 births
Living people
Indian cricketers
Assam cricketers
People from Nagaon district
Cricketers from Assam